Le Grazie is a village in Tuscany, central Italy, administratively a frazione of the comune of Colle di Val d'Elsa, province of Siena. At the time of the 2018 parish census its population was 2,171.

References 

Frazioni of Colle di Val d'Elsa